Jacob Appel (1680–1751) was a Dutch painter active in the 18th century. He was born in Amsterdam in 1680. After studying under Timotheus de Graaf in the years 1690–1692, he was instructed in landscape painting by David Van der Plaas. According to Descamps, he at first imitated the works of Tempesta, but later changed his style, and adopted that of Albert Meijeringh. He painted both landscapes and portraits. He died in 1751 at Amsterdam. He is well known as painter of the famous Petronella Oortman's Dollhouse.

References

Attribution:
 

1680 births
1751 deaths
Painters from Amsterdam
18th-century Dutch painters
18th-century Dutch male artists
Dutch male painters